Phyllonorycter viciae is a moth of the family Gracillariidae. It can be found on Hokkaido island in Japan and in the Russian Far East.

The wingspan is 6–7 mm.

The larvae feed as leaf miners on Vicia japonica, Vicia baicalensis, Vicia cracca, Vicia subrotundata, Lathyrus davidii, Lathyrus komarovii and Lathyrus japonicus maritimus. The mine is ptychonomous and occupies the whole lower surface of a single leaf which is folded longitudinally.

References

viciae
Moths of Japan
Moths of Asia

Moths described in 1963
Taxa named by Tosio Kumata
Leaf miners